Last Precinct may refer to:

The Last Precinct, American TV series beginning 1986 
The Last Precinct (novel), 2000 crime novel by Patricia Cornwell